Pagėgiai Municipality is a municipality in Tauragė County, Lithuania.

Seniūnijos (Elderships or Wards) 
The Pagėgiai municipality contains 5 seniūnijos (in English: elderships or wards); the main town or village is listed for each.

  – 
  – 
  – Pagėgiai
  – Stoniškiai
  – Vilkyškiai

Population by locality

Status: M, MST - city, town / K, GST - village / VS - steading

References 

Municipalities of Tauragė County
Lithuania Minor
Municipalities of Lithuania